Ahmet Ağaoğlu, also known as Ahmet Bey Ağaoğlu (December 1869 – 19 May 1939), was a prominent Azerbaijani and naturalized Turkish politician, publicist and journalist. He was one of the founders of Pan-Turkism and liberal Kemalism.

Life

Early life
Ağaoğlu was born in December 1869 to a Shia Muslim family in the town of Shusha in the Elisabethpol Governorate, Russian Empire. His father, Mirza Hassan, was a cotton farm owner of the Qurteli tribe, and his mother, Taze Khanum, was of the seminomadic Sariji Ali tribe. Agaoglu assumed his fathers family migrated form Erzurum to the Karabakh region in the 18th century. The head of the a larger household of about 40 people was the older brother of his father, a religious man. His primary education included the reading the tales of Leyla and Mecnun, Bustan and Gülistan and Persian and Arabic literature.  In 1888, he arrived in Paris, where he studied until 1894 and came under the influence of French Orientalists like Ernest Renan and James Darmesteter on Persianocentricism. Ağaoğlu was enrolled at the École pratique des hautes études and studied the history, language and religion of ancient Iran under the supervision of James Darmesteter. He collaborated with Darmesteter on the French translation of the Letter of Tansar and presented the paper "Les Croyances Mazdéennes dans la religion Chiîte" at the ninth International congress of Orientalists (London, 5–12 September 1892). He had the opportunity to work with some of the France's best-known periodicals e.g. writing a series of essays, entitled "The Persian Society" (La Société persane), in La Nouvelle Revue between 1891–1893. Ağaoğlu, who introduced himself as a Persian in the essays, defended the Iranian historical presence and importance in the Islamic world and blamed the Turkic peoples for the decline of the Islamic civilization. In 1896 he returned to Shusha, where he was a teacher of the French language at the local school, a post he held for one year. After his departure to Baku the next year, he also taught French and wrote books on various subjects and also for a variety of magazines. He also began embracing his Turkish identity. He spoke fluently a lot of languages (Azerbaijani, Persian, Russian, French and the Ottoman Turkish). From June 1905, together with Ali bey Huseynzadeh, he was the editor of the Hayat newspaper, which played an important role in the formation of nationalist thought in Azerbaijan. From December 19, 1905 he published the newspaper "Irshad", and in 1907, at the same time, the newspaper "Progress" in Russian. He started publishing the newspaper "Taraggi" in June 1908 and was its publisher until he left for Turkey (1909).

Nationalist politician
In 1905, Ağaoğlu played an important role in the prevention of ethnic clashes between Armenians and Azeris. He was also elected as Duma representative for the Muslims of Trancaucasia. Along with Nasib bey Yusifbeyli, Ağaoğlu became a founder of the "Difai" (Defender) National Committee in Ganja, which in 1917 merged with the Turkic Party of Federalists and Musavat into a single party. Fleeing police persecution and possible imprisonment, in late 1908, Ağaoğlu moved to Constantinople during the Young Turk Revolution. He joined the Iranian nationalist association (Anjoman-e Sa‘ādat) in Istanbul and collaborated with its press organ, Sorush, in 1909. Ağaoğlu wrote his essays in this Persian periodical from the standpoint of Iranian patriotism and criticized hardly the pro-Russian Shah of Persia, Mohammad Ali Shah Qajar, and the Russian military intervention in Iran. He became an Ottoman citizen in 1910 and was appointed as a school inspector and then as an instructor at Istanbul University (Darülfünun). In 1912 he joined the Central Committee of the Committee for Union and Progress and was elected to the Ottoman Parliament as an MP for Karahisar. In the same years, along with other émigrés from the Russian Empire, like the pan-Turkist writers Yusuf Akçura and Ali bey Huseynzade, Ağaoğlu became a key figure in the Turkish movement led by Akçura's journal Türk Yurdu ("Turkish Homeland") and became president of the Türk Ocağı ("Turkish Hearth") movement.

Upon the establishment of the Azerbaijan Democratic Republic (ARD) in May 1918, Ağaoğlu returned to Azerbaijan. He became an Azerbaijani citizen, was elected to Parliament (Milli Mejlis) and was chosen to represent the ADR at the Paris Peace Conference in 1919. However, he was imprisoned by the British on Malta while on his way to the conference. He was set free only in 1921.

Later life
After his liberation he moved to Ankara and continued his journalistic and political activities there, as editor-in-chief of the official newspaper Hâkimiyet-i Milliye ("National Sovereignty") and as a close adviser of Atatürk. He was so successful in his work that on the 29 October 1921, he got appointed General Director of Press and Information by Atatürk. From December on he was back in Ankara taking up his work which included the management of the Anadolu Ajansı. Speaking in support of Westernization and secularization of Turkish society, he wrote in 1928:

In 1923 he was elected MP and later was involved in the Constitutional Committee. In 1930 he founded the Free Republican Party, but as it became successful it was closed down in the same year, bringing an end to his political career. In 1933 he published the newspaper Akın. Due to the critical views towards Inönüs Government published in Akin, it was closed in fall 1933.

Ağaoğlu died in Istanbul in 1939. He was laid to rest at the Feriköy Cemetery in Istanbul. He was married to Sitare Hanım, and had five children. His son, Samet Ağaoğlu became an important figure in Democrat Party's administration. Samet's wife Neriman also became a politician and elected to the parliament from Justice Party. His other children include, Süreyya Ağaoğlu who became the first female lawyer in Turkey and Tezer Taşkıran, a Turkish writer and politician.

Liberal Kemalism 

Liberal Kemalism is the combination of Kemalism, the founding ideology of the Republic of Turkey, and liberalism, which is based on freedom.

Liberal Kemalism emerged as a result of the liberal interpretation of Kemalist thought by Ahmet Ağaoğlu in the early years of the republic in Turkey. Ağaoğlu, on the one hand, defined himself as a "Reformist and Kemalist", on the other hand he tried to develop an idea of "Liberal Kemalism".

Views
Ağaoğlu considered cultural and educational progress to be the major part for national liberation and viewed the emancipation of women as part of the struggle. Ağaoğlu was the first member of the Azeri national intelligentsia to raise his voice for the equal rights for women.

In his book Woman in the Islamic World, published in 1901, he claimed that "without women liberated, there can be no national progress".

Publications 
Üç Medeniyet (Three civilizations)

Islamlıkta Kadın (Woman in the Islamic World)

İran ve İnkılabı (The Iranian Revolution)

1550 ile 1900 arasında İran (Iran between 1550 and 1900)

Literature
 Audrey L. Altstadt: The Azerbaijani Turks. Power and Identity under Russian Rule, Stanford 1992.
 François Georgeon: "Les débuts d'un intellectuel azerbaidjanais: Ahmed Ağaoğlu en France (1888-1894)", in Passé turco-tatar, présent soviétique: études offertes à Alexandre Bennigsen, Paris 1986.
 Charles Kurzman: Modernist Islam, 1840-1940. A Sourcebook, New York 2002.
 A. Holly Shissler: Turkish Identity between Two Empires. Ahmet Ağaoğlu and the Development of Turkism, London 2002.
 Ali Kalirad: "From Iranism to Pan-Turkism: A Less-known Page of Ahmet Ağaoğlu’s Biography",  Iran and the Caucasus, Volume 22, Issue 1 (2018), pp. 80–95.
 Ali Kalirad: Az jāmʻe-ye Īrānī tā mīhan-e Turkī: zendegīnāme-ye fekrī va siyāsī-ye Aḥmad Āqāyef (1869-1939) [in Persian], Tehran 2013.
 Adeeb Khalid: The Politics of Muslim Cultural Reform: Jadidism in Central Asia, Berkeley 1998.
 Tadeusz Swietotochwksi: Russian Azerbaijan, 1905-1920. The Shaping of National Identity in a Muslim Community, New York 1985.

References

1869 births
1939 deaths
Azerbaijan Democratic Republic politicians
Emigrants from the Russian Empire to the Ottoman Empire
Azerbaijani journalists
Azerbaijani Shia Muslims
Burials at Feriköy Cemetery
Deputies of Kars
Liberal Republican Party (Turkey) politicians
20th-century Turkish politicians
Malta exiles
Pan-Turkists
People from Elizavetpol Governorate
Politicians from Shusha
Saint Petersburg State University alumni
Turkish male journalists
Turkish nationalists
Turkish people of Azerbaijani descent
University of Paris alumni
Shusha Realni School alumni
Ağaoğlu family
Expatriates from the Russian Empire in France